Eremophila pentaptera  is a flowering plant in the figwort family, Scrophulariaceae and is endemic to South Australia. It is a small shrub with light green to reddish-brown branches, succulent leaves and light purple to reddish-violet flowers. It is restricted to a few areas in the north of the state.

Description
The older branches are greyish-white and are often grooved. They are usually dished on the upper surface and convex on the lower side.

The sepals are often tinged purple and are triangular in cross-section. The petal tube is light purple to reddish-violet on the outside and the inner half of the lowest petal lobe and inside of the tube are cream-coloured with faint lilac spots. Both surfaces of the petal tube and lobes are glabrous except the middle of the lower lobe and the inside of the tube which have long, soft hairs. The 4 stamens are about the same length as the petal tube.

Taxonomy and naming
The species was first formally described by J.M.Black in 1922 and the description was published in Transactions and Proceedings of the Royal Society of South Australia. Black noted: The specific epithet (pentaptera) is derived from the Ancient Greek πέντε (pénte) meaning "five" and πτερόν (pterón) meaning "feather" or "wing" referring to the wing-like sepals of this species.

Distribution and habitat
Eremophila pentaptera is only found in two disjunct areas in South Australia, one near Miller's Creek and Kalina, and the other in the Copper Hills in the Pedirka Desert.

Use in horticulture
This is one of the very few eremophilas that has succulent leaves. It has not been widely grown in gardens but appears to have potential for use in warm, frost-free areas. It can be propagated from cuttings and is best grown in well-drained soil in a sunny position.

References

pentaptera
Flora of South Australia
Plants described in 1922
Taxa named by John McConnell Black